Thomas J. Nugent, Jr. is an engineer and current President of LaserMotive, a laser power beaming and research company.

He previously worked as a project scientist at Intellectual Ventures Labs, working on a variety of projects including the "Photonic Fence," a system for shooting down mosquitoes via laser to help prevent the spread of malaria.

Nugent holds a B.S. in Physics from University of Illinois at Urbana–Champaign, and M.S. in Materials Science and Engineering from Massachusetts Institute of Technology.

Publications

References

21st-century American physicists
21st-century American engineers
Year of birth missing (living people)
Living people
Grainger College of Engineering alumni
MIT School of Engineering alumni